Walter Moberly may refer to:

Walter Moberly (engineer), British-born civil engineer active in Canada
Walter Hamilton Moberly (1881–1974), British academic and author of Crisis in the University (1949)
R. W. L. Moberly, British theologian